Taking place at Lake Lanier, Georgia, United States, the 1996 Summer Olympics saw the debut of lightweight rowing events.

Medal table

Men's events

Women's events

See also
 Rowers at the 1996 Summer Olympics

References

External links
 Official Olympic Report

 
1996 Summer Olympics events
1996
Olymp